The Museum of Aviation is the second-largest aerospace museum of the United States Air Force. The museum is located just outside Warner Robins, Georgia, and near Robins Air Force Base. , the museum included four exhibit buildings and more than 85 historic aircraft, among other exhibits, on its . The museum is also the home of the Georgia Aviation Hall of Fame. Admission is free to the nearly half-million visitors each year, which makes it the fourth-most-visited museum of the United States Department of Defense.

History 
The Museum of Aviation, originally the Southeastern Museum of Aviation, was founded in 1980, after World War I aviator Guy Orlando Stone offered his collection of aviation memorabilia to Robins Air Force Base if the base could build a museum to house it. The Air Force approved the museum in late 1980, and the Southeastern Museum of Aviation Foundation, a non-profit, was incorporated in 1981 with the support of local civilians and base officials. Also in 1981, the Air Force Logistics Command, under General James P. Mullins, created its Heritage Program to preserve the history of Air Force logistics. The museum became part of the base's contribution to the program.

The museum opened its first office in 1982 after the acquisition of another private collection. That same year, the Air Force approved the museum's ten-year plan, and fundraising efforts began to collect the $9.5 million in projected construction costs for a permanent museum facility. The museum's first airplane arrived in 1983; twenty-seven total airplanes were acquired over the course of the year. The museum officially opened to the public in November 1984 with twenty planes on display and twenty more being restored.

By 1988, the museum's name had changed to the Museum of Aviation at Robins.

In 1989, Georgia governor Joe Frank Harris signed legislation to create the Georgia Aviation Hall of Fame, to be housed at the museum. Among the original inductees included Stone, whose collection had helped launch the museum.

In the 1990s, museum facilities expanded with addition of the "Hangar One" exhibit space in a former aircraft hangar. In 1992, the museum dedicated its 60,000-square-foot "Phase II" facility, later named the Eagle Building, which housed a theater, a diorama, and more aircraft, among other exhibits. In 1996, the "Century of Flight Hangar" added an additional 60,000 square feet.

In 2013, the museum announced that thirty-two aircraft were to be removed from display. Some of these were relocated to other museums, while others were scrapped on-site.

In 2019, the museum unveiled a statue of Eugene Bullard, the first African-American pilot to fly in combat. Bullard, a native of Columbus, Georgia, served in the "Aéronautique Militaire", or French Air Force during World War I. He was posthumously commissioned as a second lieutenant in the U.S. Air Force in 1994.

Aircraft on display

Bombers

 Boeing B-17G Flying Fortress
 Boeing B-29B Superfortress
 Boeing B-52D Stratofortress
 Douglas VB-26B Invader
 Douglas WB-66D Destroyer
 Lockheed P-2H Neptune
 Martin B-57B Canberra
 Rockwell B-1B Lancer

Cargo aircraft

 Beechcraft C-45G Expeditor
 Boeing EC-135N
 Boeing KC-97L Stratofreighter
 Cessna UC-78 Bobcat
 Curtiss C-46D Commando
 de Havilland Canada C-7A Caribou
 Douglas C-47A Skytrain
 Douglas C-54G Skymaster
 Fairchild C-119B Flying Boxcar
 Fairchild UC-123K Provider
 Douglas C-124C Globemaster II
 Lockheed AC-130A Spectre
 Lockheed C-130E Hercules
 Lockheed C-141C Starlifter
 Lockheed EC-121K
 Lockheed VC-140B

Fighters

 Cessna A-37A Dragonfly
 Convair F-102A Delta Dagger
 Convair F-106A Delta Dart
 Curtiss P-40N Warhawk
 Fairchild Republic A-10A Thunderbolt II
 General Dynamics F-16A Fighting Falcon
 General Dynamics F-111E Aardvark
 Lockheed F-80C Shooting Star
 McDonnell F-101F Voodoo
 McDonnell Douglas F-4D Phantom II
 McDonnell Douglas F-15A Eagle
 McDonnell Douglas F-15A Eagle
 McDonnell RF-101C Voodoo
 Mikoyan-Gurevich MiG-17
 North American F-86H Sabre
 North American F-100D Super Sabre
 North American P-51D Mustang – Replica
 North American P-51H Mustang
 Northrop F-89J Scorpion
 Republic F-84E Thunderjet
 Republic F-105D Thunderchief

Helicopters

 Bell UH-1F Iroquois
Bell UH-1P Iroquois
 Kaman HH-43A Huskie
 Sikorsky H-19D Chickasaw
 Sikorsky HH-3E
 Sikorsky MH-53M
 Vertol CH-21B Workhorse

Missiles and drones

 AIM-4D Falcon
 AIM-4E Falcon
 AIM-4F Falcon
 AIM-4G Falcon
 AIM-9L Sidewinder
 AIM-26A Falcon
 AIM-120 AMRAAM
 AIR-2A Genie
 AGM-28 Hound Dog
 AGM-88 HARM
 AGM-136A Tacit Rainbow
 AQM-34N Firebee
 AQM-34V Firebee II
 BQM-34A Firebee
 BQM-34F Firebee II
 Lockheed D-21
 MGM‐13A Mace
 MQM-107D Streaker
 TM-61A Matador
 YCGM-121B Seek Spinner

Trainers

 Boeing-Stearman PT-17 Kaydet
 Cessna T-37B Tweet
 Fairchild PT-19A
 Lockheed T-33A
 North American T-6G Texan
 North American T-28A Trojan
 North American T-39A Sabreliner
 Ryan PT-22 Recruit
 Vultee BT-13A Valiant

Special aircraft
The SR-71A Blackbird on display is the current record holder for the fastest flight airspeed.

 1896 Chanute Glider
 Aeronca 7AC Champion
 Cessna O-1E Bird Dog
 Cessna O-2A Skymaster
 Cessna U-3B
 de Havilland Canada U-6A
 Epps 1912 Monoplane
 Grumman HU-16B Albatross
 Helio U-10D
 Laister-Kauffman TG-4A
 Lockheed SR-71A Blackbird
 Lockheed U-2D
 Northrop Grumman RQ-4A Global Hawk
 Rockwell OV-10 Bronco
 Stinson L-5E Sentinel

Education Center

The museum provides a non-profit education center called the National STEM Academy. The academy offers field trip and independent programs that integrate programs and hands-on STEM disciplines with the humanities such as history and literature through the Heritage program and others. The programs highlight career opportunities and workforce development strategies.

Field trips, workshops, and special events are conducted both at the Museum of Aviation, through outreach at school sites, and via live virtual field trips.

Proceeds from all National STEM Academy programs as well as National STEM Academy monetary donations go are used to support the National STEM Academy.

See also
 List of aerospace museums

References

External links
 Museum of Aviation

Aerospace museums in Georgia (U.S. state)
Military and war museums in Georgia (U.S. state)
Museums in Houston County, Georgia
Air force museums in the United States